The Humble Administrator's Garden is a Chinese garden in Suzhou, a UNESCO World Heritage Site and one of the most famous of the gardens of Suzhou. The garden is located at 178 Northeast Street (东北街178号), Gusu District.
At 78 mu, it is the largest garden in Suzhou and is considered by some to be the finest garden in all of southern China.

History 

On the garden's site was first built a garden during the Shaoxing period (1131-1162) of the Southern Song Dynasty. Afterwards it changed ownership, and was destroyed or modified continually. It was the residence and garden of Lu Guimeng, a Tang Dynasty scholar. Later in the Yuan Dynasty it became the Dahong Temple's garden.

In 1513, Wang Xiancheng, an Imperial Envoy and poet of the Ming Dynasty, created a garden on the site of the dilapidated Dahong Temple which had been burnt during the Ming conquest.  In 1510, he retired to his native home of Suzhou on the occasion of his father's death. He had experienced a tumultuous official life punctuated by various demotions and promotions, and gave up his last official post as magistrate of Yongjia county in Zhejiang province, and began to work on the garden. This garden, meant to express his fine taste, received close attention from the renowned artist, Suzhou native, and friend, Wen Zhengming. The garden was named (first evidence around 1517) after a verse by the famous scholar official of the Jin Dynasty, Pan Yue, in his prose, An Idle Life, "I enjoy a carefree life by planting trees and building my own house...I irrigate my garden and grow vegetables for me to eat...such a life suits a retired official like me well". This verse symbolized Wang's desire to retire from politics and adopt a hermit's life in the manner of Tao Yuanming. In the Xianju rhyme-prose, he writes 'This is the way of ruling for an unsuccessful politician'.  It took 16 years until 1526 to complete.  Wen Zhenming wrote an essay Notes of Wang's Humble Administrator's Garden, and painted Landscapes of the Humble Administrator's Garden in 1533 including 31 paintings and poems to commemorate the garden. Wen produced a second album of eight leaves showing sites in the garden in 1551, with different views but the same poems as in 1533.

Wang's son lost the garden to pay gambling debts, and it has changed hands many times since.  In 1631 the eastern garden was divided from the rest and purchased by Wang Xinyi, Vice Minister of the Justice Board.  He added many modifications over the next four years, finishing work in 1635.  After completion it was renamed Dwelling Upon Return to the Countryside.  The central garden was purchased by Jiang Qi, Governor of Jiangsu in 1738. After extensive renovations he renamed it Garden Rebuilt. In 1860, it became the residence of a Taiping prince, Li Xiucheng, and it was remodelled, and the current aspect of the garden is said to be inherited from this period. Also in 1738 the Western Garden was purchased by Ye Shikuan Chief Histographer, and renamed The Garden of Books.  The Garden of Books was purchased by a Suzhou merchant, Zhang Lüqian, in 1877 and renamed The Subsidiary Garden.  In 1949 all three parts of the garden were rejoined by the Chinese government and subsequently opened to the public, then restored in 1952.  In 1997 the garden was given UNESCO World Heritage status.

Cao Xueqin, author of the Dream of the Red Chamber, is supposed to have lived at the garden during his teenage years – around 1735.  Among Chinese scholars, it is believed that much of the garden in his novel Dream of the Red Chamber was inspired by the scenery of the Humble Administrator's Garden.

Design 

The garden contains numerous pavilions and bridges set among a maze of connected pools and islands. It consists of three major parts set about a large lake: the central part (Zhuozheng Yuan), the eastern part (once called Guitianyuanju, Dwelling Upon Return to the Countryside), and a western part (the Supplementary Garden). The house lies in the south of the garden. In total, the garden contains 48 different buildings with 101 tablets, 40 steles, 21 precious old trees, and over 700 Suzhou-style penjing/penzai. Liu Dunzhen judged that the arrangement of rocks and water in the ponds of the central third may have its origins in the early Qing. The western third retains the late nineteenth-century layout, while the eastern third has seen several renovation since. But Clunas believes that even this is unreasonably optimistic, and he underlines that Liu Dunzhen and others tend to imply that, "despite the vicissitudes of history, there is continuity at the much more important level of essence".

Xue Zhijian, the curator of the garden and of the Suzhou Garden Museum, explained the exquisite design and aesthetic value of the Humble Administrator's Garden, the largest of Suzhou's gardens. "This style of Suzhou old style garden has numerous layers," Xue says. "There are four particular components: the stone, the plant, the architecture and the water." And these are woven together in endless combinations. 
At one corner in the Humble Administrator's Garden, rocks cutthrough the wall, making viewers feel like they are exploring a mountain, despite the fact that they are in the middle of the city. The plants here represent various seasons, peonies for spring, lotus for summer, osmanthus in the winter time and plum blooms in winter.

Eastern Garden: Composed of a few buildings around a central great lawn and pond combination.  The lawn is ringed by a grove of crape myrtle trees in allusion to the Tang Dynasty State Secretariat which was nicknamed the Crape Myrtle Department.

Central Garden: This section is composed of many scenes arranged around the "Surging Wave" Pond.  Within the pond three islands recreate the scenery of the fairy islands of the east sea (see Penglai).

Western Garden: This part is only half the size of the central part, and is also mainly dominated by water. The pond runs from north to south, and at the central part rises an islet. Although small, it is planned with meticulous care and precision. The buildings, though numerous, do not clutter; small mountains and ponds do not give a cramped impression.

See also 
Chinese garden
Suzhou
World Heritage Sites in China

Notes

References

Sources

External links

Bibliography on Gardens in China: Sources in Western Languages

Classical Gardens of Suzhou
Major National Historical and Cultural Sites in Jiangsu
AAAA-rated tourist attractions